Morophaga is a genus of moths belonging to the family Tineidae.

The genus has almost cosmopolitan distribution.

Species:
 Morophaga borneensis Robinson, 1986 
 Morophaga bucephala (Snellen, 1884)

References

Tineidae
Tineidae genera